Aleksandr Alekseyev (Алексеев, Александр) or Alexander Alexeev may refer to:

 Aleksandr Alekseyev (boxer) (born 1981), Russian cruiserweight boxer
 Aleksandr Alekseyev (footballer), (born 1989), Russian footballer
 Alexander Alexeyev (diplomat) (1913–1989), Soviet intelligence agent
 Alexander Alexeyev (ice hockey) (born 1999), Russian ice hockey player
 Aleksandr Alekseyev (ice hockey, born 1968), Belarusian ice hockey player
 Alexandre Alexeieff (1901–1982), Russian-born French illustrator
 Alexander Alexeev (conductor), born 1938, Russian conductor